Rubus curtipes, the shortstalk dewberry, is a North American species of dewberry in section Procumbentes (formerly Flagellares) of the genus Rubus, a member of the rose family.  It grows in scattered locations in the northeastern and north-central United States from Massachusetts west to Minnesota and south to Tennessee, but nowhere is it very common.

Rubus curtipes is a prickly perennial with biennial canes. First-year canes are arching, sometimes rooting the tips. Leaves on first-year canes are palmately compound with 3 or 5 leaflets. Second-year canes  are low-arching, sometimes trailing along the ground, with some simple (non-compound) leaves mixed with some compound leaves with 3 leaflets. Flowers are in flat-topped arrays.

References

External links
Photo of herbarium specimen at Missouri Botanical Garden, collected in Missouri in 2003

curtipes
Plants described in 1943
Flora of the United States